Bumann is a German occupational surname for a farmer. Notable people with this name include:
Dirk Bumann, German infection biologist 
Franz Bumann (1924–2005), Swiss alpine skier
Kai Bumann (1961–2022), German conductor

References

German-language surnames
Occupational surnames
Surnames of Swiss origin